José Manuel Figueroa (born 10 April 1939) is a Puerto Rican weightlifter. He competed in the men's light heavyweight event at the 1968 Summer Olympics.

References

1939 births
Living people
Puerto Rican male weightlifters
Olympic weightlifters of Puerto Rico
Weightlifters at the 1968 Summer Olympics
People from Guayama, Puerto Rico
Pan American Games medalists in weightlifting
Pan American Games silver medalists for Puerto Rico
Weightlifters at the 1963 Pan American Games
Medalists at the 1963 Pan American Games
20th-century Puerto Rican people